EKS is a Finnish DJ (disk jockey) hardware manufacturer, nowadays best known for their Otus product line. Founded in 1955 as Voimaradio Oy, EKS was one of the first companies to introduce digital DJ systems to the market with the XP10 DJ interface in 2001.

The EKS products
XP10 - A digital USB DJ controller with integrated audio interface
XP5 - A digital USB DJ controller with integrated audio interface
Otus Dualdeck - A digital USB DJ controller with integrated multichannel audio interface
XMAP MIDI Mapper - A MIDI mapping software for EKS controllers

See also
EKS Otus

References
 The EKS Story
 Tapio M. Köykkä - Stereotekniikan toisinajattelija

External links
EKS website
EKS Otus homepage

Entertainment companies of Finland